The shortnose guitarfish (Zapteryx brevirostris) is a species of fish in the Rhinobatidae family found in the southwest Atlantic in coastal parts near sandy sea floors of southern Brazil, through Uruguay, to northeast Argentina. Their diet consist of Crabs, worms, clams and small fishes. The guitarfish has become critically endangered because of the rapid decline caused by overfishing.

References

shortnose guitarfish
Fish of the Western Atlantic
Fish of Uruguay
shortnose guitarfish
Taxonomy articles created by Polbot